The Brick: Bodega Chronicles is the debut album by American Brooklyn-based rapper Joell Ortiz. It was released on April 24, 2007 through Koch Records. Production was handled by several record producers, including Frank Dukes, Alchemist, MoSS, P-Money and Showbiz. It features guest appearances from Akon, Big Daddy Kane, Big Noyd, Cashmere, Gab Gacha, Grafh, Immortal Technique, La Bruja, Lord Black, Maino, Ras Kass, Sha Stimuli, Solomon and Styles P.

Track listing

Charts

References

External links

E1 Music albums
2007 debut albums
Joell Ortiz albums
Albums produced by MoSS
Albums produced by P-Money
Albums produced by Frank Dukes
Albums produced by Showbiz (producer)
Albums produced by the Alchemist (musician)